Voix de fait is Manu Militari's debut album released on February 28, 2006. The album was a nominee for the Author or compositor of the year and Hip hop album of the year categories at the Félix Awards in 2006.

Track listing
"Voix de fait"
"Quatre saisons"
"Le meilleur des mondes"
"L'empreinte" https://www.youtube.com/watch?v=w9P7LFWEAqY
"Ganstérisme" (featuring 4Say & Ott)
"L'an 40"
"Mon inspiration"
"La piaule"
"Au parloir"
"La traversée du lac Nasser"
"Marche funèbre"
"Conclusion" (featuring Rime Organisé)
"Bonus Track"

References

Manu Militari albums
2006 albums